Mansfield (also called Mansfield Village, Dicksons Mills, Dixons Mills, Dublin or New Dublin) is an unincorporated community in Jackson Township, Parke County, in the U.S. state of Indiana.

History 
The village was originally named New Dublin by James Kelsey in 1820. Within a couple of years, it was called Dickson's Mills, and then Strain's Mills, before it became known as Mansfield in the 1830s.

The village prospered when a roller mill was built by James Kelsey and Francis Dickson in 1820. As the milling industry expanded, the village grew to a thriving town of more than 300. A sash mill and carding mill were added, and the little town gained a general store, blacksmith, cooperage and wagon maker, and a church and school were organized.

See also

 List of Registered Historic Places in Indiana
 Mansfield Roller Mill
 Big Rocky Fork Covered Bridge
 Mansfield Covered Bridge
 Parke County Covered Bridges
 Pleasant Valley Cemetery
 Parke County Covered Bridge Festival

References

External links

Unincorporated communities in Indiana
Unincorporated communities in Parke County, Indiana